Live at Roseland is a 2001 live album by the band RatDog, featuring former Grateful Dead guitarist and singer Bob Weir. In contrast to studio album Evening Moods, this release contains mostly songs from the Grateful Dead song book. It was recorded at the Roseland Theater in Portland, Oregon, on April 25 and 26, 2001.

The song "Ashes and Glass" contains an instrumental excerpt of Grateful Dead's well-known jam classic "Dark Star".

Reception

In a review for AllMusic, William Ruhlmann wrote: "RatDog comes off as a Grateful Dead clone band with the Dead's surviving co-lead vocalist at the helm... In addition to the repertoire, there is the overall musical style of the band, which, despite the presence of a saxophone, has a very Dead-like feel. Add it up, and this is music Deadheads will welcome."

Author Dean Budnick stated that, despite the presence of some "agreeable interpretations" of Dead material, "the release fails to deliver on the band's full resources."

Track listing

Disc one
"The Music Never Stopped" (John Perry Barlow, Bob Weir) – 10:25
"New Minglewood Blues" (trad., arr. Weir) – 8:55
"Loser" (Robert Hunter, Jerry Garcia) – 9:43
"Friend of the Devil" (John Dawson, Hunter, Garcia) – 5:22
"Corrina" (Hunter, Weir) – 10:09
"Bird Song" (Hunter, Garcia) – 12:08
"Ashes and Glass" (André Pessis, Weir, Jeff Chimenti, Dave Ellis, Mark Karan, Jay Lane, Mike McGinn, Rob Wasserman) – 14:13

Disc two
"Estimated Prophet" (Barlow, Weir) – 14:20
"Bass/Drums" (Wasserman, Lane) – 6:13
"Mission in the Rain" (Hunter, Garcia) – 8:21
"Even So" (Gerrit Graham, Weir, Chimenti, Ellis, Karan, Matthew Kelly, Lane, McGinn, Wasserman) – 8:52
"Tennessee Jed" (Hunter, Garcia) – 8:44
"The Other One" (Bill Kreutzmann, Weir) – 8:57
"Bird Song" (Hunter, Garcia) – 8:45
"Turn On Your Love Light" (Deadric Malone, Joseph Scott) – 10:56

Recording dates
April 25, 2001 - Disc 1 tracks 1-3 & 6, Disc 2 tracks 4-7
April 26, 2001 - Disc 1 tracks 4-5 & 7, Disc 2 tracks 1-3 & 8

Credits

RatDog
Kenny Brooks – saxophone
Jeff Chimenti – background vocals, keyboards
Mark Karan – background vocals, lead guitar
Jay Lane – background vocals, drums
Rob Wasserman – double bass
Bob Weir – guitar, vocals

Production
FOH engineer, recording & mixing – Michael McGinn
Assistant recording engineer – Jose Neves
Assistant mix engineer – Mike Frietas
Mastering engineer – Kris Ziakis
Monitor engineer – Chris Charucki
Cover art & layout design – Gary Houston, Kevin Hutton
Photography – Susana Millman, Stephen Dorian Miner
Album coordination – Cassidy Law

References

2001 live albums
Bob Weir albums
Grateful Dead Records live albums
RatDog albums